The Victor Holm Homestead is a historic late 19th-century homestead property in Kasilof, Alaska.  The  property is located on Cohoe Road, on the west bank of the Kasilof River.  The property was settled in about 1890 by Victor Holm, who built a rough log cabin on the property then, and later a more refined log structure in 1915.  He also built a wellhouse, outhouse, and food storage cache that have survived.  His original cabin was listed on the National Register of Historic Places as the Victor Holm Cabin in 1977; this cabin was moved away from an eroding bluff in 2011 by the Kachemak Heritage Land Trust. The property is now owned by the Kachemak Regional Historic Association.

The entire property was listed on the National Register of Historic Places in 2006.

See also
National Register of Historic Places listings in Kenai Peninsula Borough, Alaska

References

Historic districts on the National Register of Historic Places in Alaska
Buildings and structures on the National Register of Historic Places in Kenai Peninsula Borough, Alaska
Houses on the National Register of Historic Places in Alaska
Historic district contributing properties in Alaska